Hennepin County Medical Center (HCMC) is a Level I  adult and pediatric trauma center and safety net hospital in Minneapolis, Minnesota, the county seat of Hennepin County. The primary 484-bed facility is on six city blocks across the street from U.S. Bank Stadium, with neighborhood clinics in the Minneapolis Whittier and East Lake neighborhoods, and the suburban communities of Brooklyn Center, Brooklyn Park, Golden Valley, St. Anthony and Richfield. A new clinic in the North Loop neighborhood downtown opened in 2017. HCMC has recognized trauma surgery specialists, transplant services, stroke specialists, advanced endoscopy/hepatobilliary center, and hyperbaric oxygen chamber. A new outpatient clinic building opened in 2018. In March 2018, the provider that operates HCMC was rebranded as Hennepin Healthcare. However, the hospital retained the name HCMC.

History

The original hospital building, established in 1887 as Minneapolis City Hospital, before being referred to as "General Hospital" or "City Hospital", sat a block from its current main location.  Ownership was transferred to the county in 1964, when it was renamed Hennepin County General Hospital. The hospital took its current name in 1974. By the late 1960s, the hospital was a disorganized patchwork of buildings, leading to the decision to clear and rebuild the facility.  The current hospital facility was completed in 1976 and renamed Hennepin County Medical Center, following a $25 million bond passed by voters in 1969. The hospital expanded in 1991 when the adjacent Metropolitan-Mount Sinai Medical Center closed. It gained Level I trauma center status in 1989, the first such site in the state.

The hospital underwent a governance change in January 2007, which created a new governing entity with greater autonomy from the county government. The hospital's public mission did not change, but this transition was made to ensure the long-term viability of the hospital. In 2012 the hospital partnered with NorthPoint Health and Wellness Center, Metropolitan Health Plan, and Hennepin County's Human Services and Public Health Department to form an accountable care organization called Hennepin Health. By February 2013, Hennepin Health had enrolled 6,000 clients.

In 2015, the Hennepin County Board allocated $192 million for a new outpatient center which features multiple clinics across from the HCMC entrance. The building opened in March 2018. In 2018, HCMC became Hennepin Healthcare.

Hennepin Healthcare's East Lake Clinic in the historic Coliseum Building and Hall was among the property locations damaged by arson during the George Floyd protests in Minneapolis–Saint Paul. A Molotov cocktail was thrown through a window in the overnight hours of May 30, 2020, destroying the clinic.

Residency programs
HCMC has independent residency programs in dentistry, pharmacy practice, emergency medicine, internal medicine, combined internal medicine/emergency medicine, family medicine, general surgery, podiatric surgery, and psychiatry. In addition, it is a rotating site for many programs from the University of Minnesota, including orthopedic surgery, urology, oral and maxillofacial surgery, otolaryngology, ophthalmology, neurosurgery, neurology, obstetrics/gynecology, pediatrics, radiology, dietetics, and many medical subspecialty fellowships. It has independent fellowships in geriatrics, critical care medicine, sleep medicine and nephrology.

NASA astronaut Kjell Lindgren is a graduate of the Emergency Medicine residency program (2002–2005). He was selected to NASA's 20th astronaut class in 2009, and spent 141 days in space on Expedition 44/45 in 2015.

Internship opportunity
Students from UCIMED, a medical school in Costa Rica, are given the opportunity to complete a sub-internship at the hospital. The initiative started thanks to an agreement signed in February 2006.

Emergency medical services

HCMC also provides emergency medical services (Hennepin EMS) for the cities of Minneapolis, Golden Valley, Shorewood, Eden Prairie, St. Louis Park, Hopkins, St. Anthony, Woodland, Excelsior, Deephaven, Tonka Bay, Richfield, and the majority of the city of Minnetonka. Hennepin EMS uses 37 type III ambulances, 4 medical director vehicles, 3 Community Paramedic vehicles and 2 EMS Command units in its fleet. All 911 response vehicles are equipped with state of the art equipment, and two state certified paramedics staff each rig. Hennepin EMS logs over 80,000 911 calls every year from an urban/suburban population base of roughly 770,000.

References

Further reading
 Nathanson, Iric, and Thomas R. Mattison. “Origins of a Modern Medical Center: Minneapolis City Hospital, 1887–1907,” Minnesota History 63 (Fall 2012), 114–23. Heavily illustrated.

Hospitals in Minnesota
Hospital buildings completed in 1976
Hospitals established in 1887
Buildings and structures in Minneapolis
Minneapolis
Hennepin County, Minnesota
Trauma centers
Public hospitals in the United States